Uncle Tom's Cabin is a 1987 American made-for-television drama film directed by Stan Lathan and starring Avery Brooks, Bruce Dern, Phylicia Rashad, and Edward Woodward. It is based on the 1852 novel of the same name by Harriet Beecher Stowe.

Cast 
 Avery Brooks as Uncle Tom
 Kate Burton as Ophelia
 Bruce Dern as Augustine St. Claire
 Paula Kelly as Cassy
 Phylicia Rashad as Eliza
 Edward Woodward as Simon Legree
 George Coe as Mr. Shelby
 Frank Converse as Trader
 Jenny Lewis as Evangeline 'Little Eva' St. Claire
 Troy Beyer as Emmeline
 Samuel L. Jackson as George
 Rhashell Hunter as Jenny
 Irma P. Hall as Mammy
 Jerry Haynes as Dr. Phillips
 Robert Graham as Elias
 Bill Bolender as Trader

References

External links 
 
 

Films directed by Stan Lathan
Showtime (TV network) films
1987 television films
1987 films
Films about American slavery
Films based on works by Harriet Beecher Stowe
Television shows based on American novels
Films with screenplays by John Gay (screenwriter)
Uncle Tom's Cabin
1980s English-language films